The Z5 was a computer designed by Konrad Zuse and manufactured by Zuse KG following an order by Ernst Leitz GmbH in Wetzlar in 1950. The computer was delivered in July 1953 and was the first commercial built-to-order mainframe in Germany. The computer was purchased to help with the design of optical lens systems.

The Z5 is the successor of the Z4, and is much more compact and powerful. Zuse implemented the machine with relays, since vacuum tubes were too unreliable at the time. The Z5 used the same principles as the Z4, but was six times faster.
It also had punched tape readers, which the Z4 did not have. It had conditional branching and five subroutine loops.

Specifications

 Frequency: ca. 40 Hz
 Arithmetic unit: Floating point numbers (36 bit length) 
 Memory: 12 words, 36 bit
 Speed: addition 0.1 second, multiplication 0.4 s, division 0.7 s
 Power consumption: 5000 watts
 Weight: ca.

References

External links
  Z5 information (German), (Google translation), (English)

1950s computers
Computer-related introductions in 1953
Konrad Zuse
Computers designed in Germany
Serial computers